Steven Ray Crawford (born April 29, 1958) is a former pitcher in Major League Baseball who played for two teams from 1980 through 1991. Crawford started his professional career with Winston-Salem in the Class-A Carolina League. He pitched in 19 games, started 14, and sported a 9–5 record with a 3.44 ERA. One of his teammates, Michael Moore, called Crawford “Shag” because of his bushy long hair and mustache, and the nickname stuck.

A versatile hard-thrower, Crawford filled various relief roles coming out from the bullpen, as a closer or middle reliever, serving as an emergency starter as well. He reached the majors in 1980 with the Boston Red Sox, spending seven years with them before moving to the Kansas City Royals (1989–91). His most productive season came in 1985 with the Red Sox, when he set career-numbers in wins (6), saves (12), strikeouts (58) and innings pitched (91.0). During the 1986 postseason, he went 2–0, including a win in Game 2 of the World Series; he did this despite going winless during the 1986 regular season. He also had three decent years with Kansas City, winning 11 games and averaging 60.0 innings of work in each season.

In a 10-season career, Crawford posted a 30–23 record with 19 saves and a 4.17 earned run average in 277 games, including 16 starts, two complete games and  innings.

External links
, or Retrosheet, or Pura Pelota

1958 births
Living people
Albuquerque Dukes players
Baseball players from Oklahoma
Boston Red Sox players
Kansas City Royals players
Major League Baseball pitchers
Northeastern State RiverHawks baseball players
Omaha Royals players
Pawtucket Red Sox players
People from Pryor Creek, Oklahoma
San Antonio Missions players
Tigres de Aragua players
American expatriate baseball players in Venezuela
Winston-Salem Red Sox players